Karl Schmid (29 June 1910 – 14 May 1998) was a Swiss rower who competed in the 1936 Summer Olympics.

Schmid was born in 1910. In 1936 he was a crew member of the Swiss boat which won the silver medal in the coxed four event. As part of the Swiss boat in the coxless four competition he won the bronze medal. He also participated in the eight event where the Swiss boat finished sixth.

His son, Kurt Schmid, rowed in the 1952 and 1960 Summer Olympics.

References

1910 births
1998 deaths
Swiss male rowers
Olympic rowers of Switzerland
Rowers at the 1936 Summer Olympics
Olympic silver medalists for Switzerland
Olympic bronze medalists for Switzerland
Olympic medalists in rowing
Medalists at the 1936 Summer Olympics
European Rowing Championships medalists